Patrick Edward Frink (February 18, 1945 – May 6, 2012) was an American basketball player.  He played one season in the National Basketball Association (NBA).

Early life
Pat Frink grew up in Wheat Ridge, Colorado in a single-parent family with his older brother, Mike, and their mother, Madge, who worked several jobs at a time. The brothers never knew their father.

Frink attended Wheat Ridge High School, where he starred as a 6'4" shooting guard. He earned all-state honor and all American honors.

College career
He played collegiately at the University of Colorado from 1965 to 1968. There he played alongside his older brother, Mike Frink. For his career, he scored 1,288 points (17.4 per game) and grabbed 251 rebounds (3.4 per game). He led the team in scoring all three seasons he played for the Buffs.

He was named second team All-Big Eight Conference his junior and senior years and was a second team Academic All-American in 1968.

NBA career
Following his graduation from Colorado, Frink was drafted by the Cincinnati Royals in the third round (27th pick) of the 1968 NBA draft. He played one season for the Royals, appearing in 48 games and averaging 2.1 points per game in 1968–69. He scored a career single-game best 17 points on January 9, 1969 against the Seattle SuperSonics. An ankle injury kept him out of the next season, and his NBA career was over.

One of his teammates was legendary hall-of-famer Oscar Robertson who, despite playing with Frink for only one season, became lifelong friends with Frink and appeared at basketball camps run by Pat and Mike Frink.

Personal life
After his basketball career ended, he focused on caring for his daughter, Kody, who was born with Rett syndrome and had a life expectancy of about seven years. She was 21 when she died in 2000.

He lived on a ranch in Tucson, Arizona and taught classes at an Indian reservation school. He ran a homeless shelter in Denver for 15 years, and pastored the homebound and hospitalized elderly Catholic community in Boulder as a layman at Sacred Heart Church for 12 years.

Frink died on May 6, 2012 in a single-vehicle accident outside Tucson, Arizona. He was 67. He was buried near his mother and daughter at the family cemetery on his ranch.

Pat Frink was survived by four sons, Shane, Gant, Garrett and Dylan, one daughter, Shalom, and eight grandchildren; Maxwell, Madalyn, Caleb, Mackenzie and four others.

References

External links
Career Stats

1945 births
2012 deaths
Basketball players from Colorado
American men's basketball players
Cincinnati Royals draft picks
Cincinnati Royals players
Colorado Buffaloes men's basketball players
People from Wheat Ridge, Colorado
Road incident deaths in Arizona
Shooting guards